Stavanger Idrettshall is an indoor arena in Stavanger, Norway. It hosts the home games of the Stavanger handball team, and then has a capacity 4100 people. This arena hosted the main stage of the 2008 European Men's Handball Championship.
 It will host the 2025 World Men's Handball Championship with the country, Croatia and Denmark.

References

External links
 

Sports venues in Stavanger
Handball venues in Norway
Indoor arenas in Norway